Grizzly Peak Winery is a winery near Grizzly Peak in Ashland, Oregon, United States.

History
Grizzly Peak was established by Al and Virginia Silbowitz, with assistance from winemaker Andy Swan of Granite Peak Winery. Grizzly Peak and Granite Peak started collaborating in 2006. Grizzly's tasting room opened in 2008. The winery was recognized at the Oregon Wine Experience in 2015 and 2017.

References

External links

 
 
 Grizzly Peak Winery at the Southern Oregon Winery Association

2006 establishments in Oregon
Ashland, Oregon
Food and drink companies established in 2006
Wineries in Oregon
American companies established in 2006